Morgan Township is the name of three townships in Indiana:
Morgan Township, Harrison County, Indiana
Morgan Township, Owen County, Indiana
Morgan Township, Porter County, Indiana

Indiana township disambiguation pages